"Read My Mind" is a song by American rock band the Killers. It was released on February 13, 2007, as the third single from their second studio album, Sam's Town (2006). It peaked at number 62 on the Billboard Hot 100. It also charted at number 15 on the UK Singles Chart.

In 2009, the song was voted at number 57 in UK radio station XFM's "100 Greatest Songs of All Time". In the same year, it was voted at number 71 on Absolute Radio's "100 Best Songs of the Decade".

Background and production
In an interview with Chicago radio station Q101, lead vocalist Brandon Flowers called "Read My Mind" the best song he had ever written. Neil Tennant and Chris Lowe (of Pet Shop Boys) saw the Killers in concert at Brixton Academy at the end of November 2006, where the idea of a remix for "Read My Mind" was discussed between the two parties. The resulting remix, "Pet Shop Boys 'Stars are blazing' mix" featuring additional vocals by Tennant and Lowe, is one of the B-sides for the single,  and is featured on the Pet Shop Boys album Disco Four.

"Read My Mind" was released as part of an iTunes EP on February 13, 2007, featuring an acoustic version and two remixes. It was also released as the third single from Sam's Town in the United Kingdom on February 26, 2007.

There was a promotion CD released in the US that featured 10 dance mixes. This included the full Pet Shop Boys mix, as well as an instrumental version and radio edit. It also featured remixes by Gabriel & Dresden, Steve Bays (from Canadian band Hot Hot Heat) and Linus Loves. The three-track American CD single was released in Best Buy stores. The single is free only with the purchase of Sam's Town.

Critical reception
Critical response to the single was positive; the song was often praised although the album received highly mixed reviews. Yahoo Music said "the album peaks with the arena-sized 'Read My Mind'". Sven Philipp (with Billboard) called the single "a gloriously melodic Duran Duran-meets-Springsteen tale about 'breakin' out of this two-star town.'" Adrien Begrand with PopMatters said, "The Killers shine on the song, Flowers’s synth offsetting Keuning’s tasteful flourishes wonderfully."  NME called the song the "righteous and anthemic album highlight." It was also listed as number 12 on Rolling Stones 100 Best Songs of 2006 even though Sam's Town had previously received negative reviews from the magazine. In reference to the Pet Shop Boys remix, The New York Times called it a "perfect match." This song was also number 84 on MTV Asias list of Top 100 Hits of 2007.  In 2020, Paste ranked the song number one on their list of the 20 greatest Killers songs, and in 2021, American Songwriter ranked the song number five on their list of the 10 greatest Killers songs.

A remix of the song is featured on the original soundtrack of the NBC television series Friday Night Lights.  It is nominated for a 2008 People's Choice Award in the category of Favorite Song from a Soundtrack.

This song was also going to be performed as a showcase performance for Chloe Warren, but due to technical complications the performance was cancelled.  "Read My Mind" was also used for the promotional video for season 14 of the television show ER on Warner Channel Latin America.

Music video
The video for "Read My Mind" was shot in Tokyo and directed by Diane Martel, shortly before the band embarked on their round of touring to New Zealand and Australia. In an interview, Brandon Flowers called the tune "kind of our favorite song" and promised the clip would find the band "in Tokyo, on bikes."

The video shows the band members having fun in different parts of Tokyo. We see them playing with some Japanese school children in Shinjuku Park, interacting with a Japanese Elvis impersonator in the Kabukicho entertainment district, releasing balloons in front of the Nihonbashi Jogakkan Girls High School, and riding on different kinds of bicycles past the Ichogaoka Hachiman Shrine in Asakusabashi. The video ends with the four members of the band checking into a capsule hotel followed by Japanese television character Gachapin.

The video premiered on February 8, 2007, on MTV's Total Request Live as part of their "Spankin' New Music Week." On the March 23, 2007, episode of VH1's Top 20 Countdown, "Read My Mind" was number one, making it the first time a Killers' video had reached that rank.

Awards and nominations

Track listings
7-inch: Vertigo / 6 02517 24568 6 – UK
 "Read My Mind" – 4:03
 "Read My Mind" (Steve Bays Remix) – 3:30

CD: Vertigo / 6 02517 24567 9 – UK
 "Read My Mind" – 4:03
 "Read My Mind" (Pet Shop Boys Stars Are Blazing Mix) (Edit) – 4:02

CD: Island / ISLR 16704-2 – U.S.
 "Read My Mind" (Pet Shop Boys Stars Are Blazing Mix) – 7:19
 "Read My Mind" (Steve Bays Remix) – 3:30
 "Read My Mind" (Like Rebel Diamonds Mix) – 4:11
 Available in the U.S. at Best Buy stores. Free with purchase of any Killers CD.

CD: Island / 6 02517 24567 9 – Germany
 "Read My Mind" (Album Version) – 4:03
 "Read My Mind" (Pet Shop Boys Radio Edit) – 4:02
 "Read My Mind" (Pet Shop Boys Instrumental) – 7:21
 "Read My Mind" (Video)

Charts

Weekly charts

Year-end charts

Certifications

Release history

See also
 List of number-one dance singles of 2007 (U.S.)

References

2006 songs
2007 singles
Island Records singles
The Killers songs
Music videos directed by Diane Martel
Song recordings produced by Alan Moulder
Song recordings produced by Flood (producer)
Songs written by Brandon Flowers
Songs written by Dave Keuning
Songs written by Mark Stoermer
Tokyo in fiction
Vertigo Records singles